Gregory-Portland Independent School District is a public school district based in Portland, Texas (USA).

In addition to Portland, the district also serves the city of Gregory as well as the unincorporated communities of Doyle, Falman-County Acres, and Tradewinds.

In 2009, the school district was rated "academically acceptable" by the Texas Education Agency.

Schools

Gregory-Portland High School (Grades 9-12)
Gregory-Portland Intermediate School (Grade 6-8)
W. C. Andrews Elementary School (Grades K-5)
Stephen F. Austin Elementary School (Grades PK-5)
T. M. Clark Elementary School (Grades PK-5)
East Cliff Elementary School (Grades K-5)

References

External links
 

School districts in San Patricio County, Texas